Rhammatocerus viatorius, the traveller grasshopper, is a species of slant-faced grasshopper in the family Acrididae. It is found in Central America, North America, and Mexico.

Subspecies
These two subspecies belong to the species Rhammatocerus viatorius:
 Rhammatocerus viatorius excelsus (Bruner, 1904)
 Rhammatocerus viatorius viatorius (Saussure, 1861)

References

Further reading

 

viatorius
Articles created by Qbugbot
Insects described in 1861